Paula Brown is a Canadian science researcher, currently at British Columbia Institute of Technology. She is the Tier 2 Canada Research Chair in Phytoanalytics.

In this position, Brown investigates the large range of chemical products made by plants, included how they are synthesized, regulated, and allocated within the tissues of plants, details of their extraction, as well as their role in plant and human health.

Brown is the Director of BCIT's Natural Health and Food Products Research Group (NRG) which works to actively support the Natural Health Products (NHP) industry for more than ten years.

In 2018 Brown was appointed as a visiting Professor of Pharmacy Science of Hunan University of Chinese Medicine.

Education 
Brown received a BSc Honours in Chemistry and Biochemistry from Dalhousie University in Halifax, Nova Scotia in 1995. She continued on in 1998 to receive a MSc in Chemistry from Simon Fraser University and in 2011 completed her PhD in Chemistry from the University of British Columbia.

Awards 
Paula Brown has earned many awards including the following.

 2016 – First Place Blue Ribbon from the American Urological Association.
 2016 – Neil Towers Award from the Natural Health Product Research Society of Canada.
 2016 – Herbal Insight Award from the American Herbal Products Association.
 2013 – Thieme Award for the Most Innovative Planta Medica Original Paper.

References 

Year of birth missing (living people)
Living people
Academic staff of the British Columbia Institute of Technology
Canadian biochemists
Dalhousie University alumni
Simon Fraser University alumni
University of British Columbia Faculty of Science alumni
Scientists from British Columbia
20th-century Canadian chemists
21st-century Canadian chemists
21st-century Canadian women scientists
20th-century Canadian women scientists